The House of Carandini (originally Risi) is an old Italian noble family, whose members occupied many important ecclesiastical and political positions.

History 
Records of the family go back at least to the 12th century, when Emperor Frederick Barbarossa gave the family the right to bear the coat of arms of the Holy Roman Empire; by the 15th century, the Carandinis had risen to political prominence in Modena. The title of Conte (Count) was obtained by a Carandini following the Battle of Lepanto (1571). Additional titles were obtained later including that of Marchese (Marquis) of Sarzano. One or more members of the family became political fugitives in the 19th century and fled to England or Australia; some of the persons listed below are their descendants.  Another family member, Filippo Cardinal Carandini, was Prefect of the Congregation for the Clergy and a participant in the 1800 papal conclave.

Notable members of the family
Andrea Carandini
Filippo Carandini
Nicolò Carandini
Marie Carandini
Matteo Carandini
Ercole Consalvi
Christopher Lee (being son of Estelle Marie Carandini)
Rosina Palmer

References

 Gianna Dotti Messori, I Carandini: la storia ei documenti di una famiglia plurisecolare. No. 144. Aedes muratoriana, 1997
 Roberto Regoli, "Ercole Consalvi, le scelte per la chiesa". Editrice Pontificia Università Gregoriana, 2006